Daniel Tupou may refer to:

 Daniel Tupou (born 1991), Australian rugby league player
 Daniel Tupou (rugby union) (born 1996), Tongan rugby union player